Michael Edwin Thornton (born March 23, 1949) is a retired United States Navy SEAL and recipient of the U.S. military's highest decoration, the Medal of Honor, for his actions in the Vietnam War. He was awarded the medal for saving the life of his senior officer, Lieutenant Thomas R. Norris, who also earned the Medal of Honor in an unrelated incident.

Early life
Born on March 23, 1949, in Greenville, South Carolina, Thornton graduated from high school in 1967 and enlisted in the United States Navy later that year in Spartanburg.

Military career
Thornton served aboard destroyers as a gunner's mate apprentice until November 1968, when he attended United States Navy SEAL selection and training at Coronado, California. He was among only 18 students who graduated from BUD/S class 49 in March 1969, which started with 129 members. He received direct assignment to SEAL Team ONE, a separate organization from the Underwater Demolition Teams that new personnel were normally assigned. Following SEAL Basic Indoctrination (SBI) training and platoon training, Thornton deployed to South Vietnam with Charlie Platoon from December 1969 to June 1970. He served numerous combat tours in Southeast Asia which ran from 1969 to December 1972.

Thornton conducted intelligence gathering operations across Vietnam. By the last quarter of 1972, U.S. involvement in the region had waned and Thornton, by then a petty officer, was one of only a dozen SEALs remaining in Vietnam.

Medal of Honor action
 
On October 31 of that year, Thornton participated in a mission to capture prisoners and gather intelligence from the Cửa Việt Base near the coast of Quảng Trị Province, just south of the Demilitarized Zone. In addition to Thornton, the mission team consisted of SEAL Lieutenant Thomas R. Norris, and three experienced Vietnamese men Thornton had worked with before, members of the LDNN, the South Vietnamese Special Forces. The group was transported by junk until sunset, then paddled a rubber boat to within a mile of shore and swam the remaining distance. Moving inland past numerous North Vietnamese encampments, the group reconnoitered through the night.

The team soon realized that they had landed too far north and were actually in North Vietnam. They found large numbers of bunker complexes and heavy concentrations of North Vietnamese troops. They patrolled slowly through the middle of the enemy troops, gathering intelligence as they went.

The group encountered a two-man North Vietnamese patrol on the beach, which the South Vietnamese attempted to capture. Thornton chased one of the enemy back towards the jungle to prevent him from alerting others. When Thornton shot him, about 50 North Vietnamese soldiers chased after him. Moving from one position to another, Thornton and the others kept the enemy confused about the number of troops they faced. Thornton was wounded in the back by a grenade. He contacted a destroyer and requested naval gunfire support, but unknown to Thornton it was struck by North Vietnamese shore batteries and unable to fire. A second destroyer was unable to maneuver into firing position for the same reason.

For the next four hours, the five men held off an enemy force estimated at 150 strong. Norris attempted to call in the Vietnamese junk boats, one of which had a mortar on board, but the destroyers forbid them from entering the line of fire. Thornton, Norris and the three Vietnamese were alone and nearly surrounded. Near dawn, Norris ordered the group to extract towards the beach, and they leap-frogged towards the surf. Norris was able to contact the cruiser  and requested that they fire for effect to cover their withdrawal. Norris covered the group's rearward movement. As he prepared to fire a LAW rocket at a group of 70 to 75 North Vietnamese troops attacking his position, he was severely wounded by a round through his head.

One of the South Vietnamese who saw Norris get shot assumed he was dead. When he found Norris, he saw that "the whole side of his head was completely gone." As enemy troops overran his position, he stopped to shoot several. Thornton put Norris on his shoulders and ran back towards the beach when the first shell from the Newport News struck the beach. The concussion from the round blew Thornton and Norris  into the air. It also slowed the advance of the enemy troops, and Thornton picked up Norris who he discovered was just barely alive.

Thornton carried Norris into the surf and began to swim with him. One of the Vietnamese was shot in the buttocks and couldn't swim, so Thornton grabbed him as well and pushed both of them out to sea. Bullets landed in the sea all around them. The Newport News left, thinking that the Americans and South Vietnamese had been killed. Thornton bandaged Norris' wound as well as he could and swam for about three hours. One of the South Vietnamese was finally picked up by the junk. He reported that the two Americans were dead, which was relayed to the Newport News. Thornton fired Norris' AK-47 to draw the attention of the junk. They were picked up and then transported to the Newport News. Thornton carried Norris to the operating room, where the doctor told Thornton, "There's no way he's going to make it."

For these actions, Thornton was awarded the Medal of Honor by President Richard Nixon during a ceremony at the White House on October 15, 1973. The man Thornton rescued, Thomas Norris, survived his wounds and was awarded the Medal of Honor from President Gerald R. Ford in a White House ceremony on March 6, 1976, for his April 1972 rescue of Lieutenant Colonel Iceal Hambleton and First Lieutenant Mark Clark in the rescue of Bat 21 Bravo. 

Thornton received a commission in 1982 as a limited duty officer and retired from the navy as a lieutenant in 1992.

Citation

Awards and decorations
 Special Warfare insignia
 Naval Parachutist insignia
 Surface Warfare Officer insignia
 Diving Officer insignia

Later career
From 1974 to 1977, Thornton served as a BUD/S instructor at NAB Coronado, California, and in 1978 was selected to serve two years with the British Special Boat Squadron (SBS) in an exchange billet. In 1980, Thornton was chosen by Commander Richard Marcinko to be a founding member of SEAL Team Six, the U.S. Navy's first unit dedicated to counter-terrorism. Thornton later became a commissioned officer in June 1982 and retired as a lieutenant in 1992. He currently sits on the board of advisors for Veterans Direct.

In 2001, Thornton received the Golden Plate Award of the American Academy of Achievement presented by Awards Council member  Lt. Thomas R. Norris, USN.

Publications
  Written with Thomas R. Norris and Dick Couch

See also
 List of Medal of Honor recipients for the Vietnam War

Footnotes

External links

 Interview with Michael Thornton at the Pritzker Military Museum & Library
 Interview with Michael Thornton by Jocko Willink
 Interview with Michael Thornton and Thomas Norris at the Pritzker Military Museum & Library

1949 births
United States Navy personnel of the Gulf War
United States Navy personnel of the Vietnam War
Living people
Native American United States military personnel
People from Greenville, South Carolina
Recipients of the Gallantry Cross (Vietnam)
Recipients of the Silver Star
United States Navy Medal of Honor recipients
United States Navy officers
United States Navy sailors
United States Navy SEALs personnel
Vietnam War recipients of the Medal of Honor
Recipients of the Humanitarian Service Medal